Serhiy Volodymyrovych Zeldi (born 13 June 1986, in Kiev, in the Ukrainian SSR of the Soviet Union – in present-day Ukraine) is a Ukrainian footballer.

External links 
 
 

1986 births
Living people
Ukrainian footballers
FC Dynamo Kyiv players
FC CSKA Kyiv players
FC Hoverla Uzhhorod players
SC Tavriya Simferopol players
FC Prykarpattia Ivano-Frankivsk (2004) players
FC Bukovyna Chernivtsi players
MFC Mykolaiv players
Association football midfielders
Footballers from Kyiv
Ukrainian Premier League players
Ukrainian First League players
Ukrainian Second League players
Ukrainian Amateur Football Championship players